Malamud is a Hebrew surname which translates to teacher in English, a variant of  Melamed; see this page for other variants.

Malamud may refer to:

 Bernard Malamud (1914-1986), American novelist, short story writer
 Carl Malamud (born 1959), American non-fiction writer
 Janna Malamud Smith (born 1952), American writer, memoirist; daughter of Bernard Malamud
Margaret Malamud (21st century), American academic and classical scholar
 Mark Malamud (born 1960), American inventor
 Rebecca Hargrave Malamud (21st century), American designer and photographer

Hebrew-language surnames
Jewish surnames

ru:Маламуд